A Son of the Plains is a 1931 American Western film directed by Robert N. Bradbury and starring Bob Custer, Doris Phillips and J.P. McGowan.

Main cast
 Bob Custer as Deputy Bob Brent 
 Doris Phillips as Ann Farrell 
 J.P. McGowan as Dan Farrell 
 Edward Hearn as Buck Brokaw 
 Eve Humes as Roxy 
 Gordon De Main as Sheriff Matt Woods 
 Al St. John as Saloon Drunk

Plot
A sheriff's deputy (Brent) mistakenly believes that his fiancee's father (Dan Farrell) is a bandit. The truth emerges after the real bandit (Brokaw) and his partner arrive.

References

Bibliography
 Michael R. Pitts. Poverty Row Studios, 1929–1940: An Illustrated History of 55 Independent Film Companies, with a Filmography for Each. McFarland & Company, 2005.

External links
 

1931 films
1931 Western (genre) films
1930s English-language films
American Western (genre) films
Films directed by Robert N. Bradbury
1930s American films